Pine Mountain is a mountain in Schoharie County, New York. It is located south-southwest of Gilboa. Moore Hill is located northwest and Stevens Mountain is located northeast of Pine Mountain.

References

Mountains of Schoharie County, New York
Mountains of New York (state)